Green String Farm is a  natural process, sustainable farm near Petaluma, California that grows fruits and vegetables year-round and sells them in an on-site farm store that is open to the public seven days a week. In addition to produce, the farm also supplies free-range eggs and grass fed beef to regional restaurants including the famed Chez Panisse in Berkeley, CA. Bob Cannard and Fred Cline founded Green String Farm and the Green String method of sustainable farming in 2003. The Green String method meets the highest standard of environmental sustainability practices, which is different from Certified Organic.

Farming practices
Green String farming methods reduce soil erosion, pesticide dependency, and loss of biodiversity; and increases resistance to natural predators. Some examples include cover crops; compost teas as soil supplements; and natural, pesticide-free methods for controlling competing plants and weeds. The farm uses the motto “50% for humans, 50% for nature” to describe their process of maintaining a balance between growing crops for human consumption and growing crops for soil improvement. Fred Cline of Cline Cellars and Jacuzzi Family Vineyards uses a Green String approach in their estate vineyards.

Green String Institute
The Green String Institute is Green String Farm's quarterly internship program. Each term, 8-12 student interns from all over the world come to Green String Farm where they live, work and learn communally for three months. While living and working on the farm, interns learn natural farming practices and sustainable approaches to small business management.

References

External links
 

Farms in California
Petaluma, California
Companies based in Sonoma County, California
Food and drink in the San Francisco Bay Area
Food and drink companies based in California